Mehdi Qoli Beg (? - ) was a Chagatai ruler in Khorasan and a courtier at the court of Shah Abbas I of Safavid dynasty. He was named Amir-e Akhour (person in charge of the royal stable,) and was sent on a diplomatic mission to Tsardom of Russia and Holy Roman Empire.

Diplomatic Mission
In 1599 and on the advice of Anthony Sherley, Shah Abbas, hoping to secure a European alliance against Ottoman Empire dispatched an embassy to Europe. The mission met with the Holy Roman Emperor, Rudolf II, who in turn sent  to Isfahan. Kakach died on the journey and his secretary,  took charge. Shah Abbas greeted von der Jabel, and sent him together with Mehdi Qoli Beg to Moscow to inform Tsar Boris Godunov of the recent Persian victory over the Ottoman Turks.

Tsar was pleased upon hearing the news, and sent 5000 men and a number of canons to help Shah Abbas in reconquering Derbent. Rudolf agreed to a triple alliance between Holy Roman Empire, Russia, and Persia against the Ottoman Turks, and assured Mehdi Qoli Beg that he will attack Ottoman Empire from the west.

See also
 Hossein Ali Beg Bayat
 Habsburg-Persian alliance

References

 
 

16th-century Iranian politicians
17th-century Iranian politicians
Ambassadors of Safavid Iran to the Tsardom of Russia
Ambassadors of Safavid Iran to the Holy Roman Empire
16th-century people of Safavid Iran
Iranian Turkmen people
17th-century deaths
17th-century people of Safavid Iran